Crackers International is a Christmas EP released by Erasure in 1988, in between the albums The Innocents and Wild!. It reached number-one in Denmark and Argentina and number 2 in the United Kingdom and Ireland.

History 

The EP appeared in several different versions. The original UK release by Mute Records consisted of four original, self-produced tracks.  In the UK, where at the time EPs were eligible for the singles chart, it became one of Erasure's most successful releases, matching the number two peak of 1986's "Sometimes". It was promoted with a simple music video for the lead track "Stop!", showing Clarke and Bell performing the song on a stage surrounded by "stop", "no entry", "give way" and similar road signs.

In the US, Crackers International was still considered an EP, although two remixes were added (bringing the track list count to six) when Sire Records released it. In the US, where EPs chart on the Billboard 200, it hit number seventy-three.  The song "Stop!" was also released as its own stand-alone single in the US, just barely making an appearance on the Billboard Hot 100 (number 97). On the US Hot Dance Music/Club Play chart "Stop!" / "Knocking on Your Door" peaked at number four as a double-sided entry.

Additionally, a version of the EP was released in the UK by Mute Records in a very limited-edition, seasonal pressing, titled Crackers International Part 2. Released originally in 12" vinyl with extended versions of "Stop!" and "Knocking on Your Door", both remixed by Mark Saunders, it also added the Christmas standard "God Rest Ye Merry Gentlemen".  It was subsequently released as a compact disc containing the original 7" versions of "Stop!" and "Knocking on Your Door" (also of note is the fact that there were two different versions of the single mix of "Stop!", one with a fade, and a slightly longer one with a 'cold' ending).

Sire Records commissioned some mixes for the song by Justin Strauss, who previously had remixed "A Little Respect" for the US market, but the mixes remain unreleased. This versions can be found on the Soundcloud page of Justin Strauss.

Twenty-five years after Crackers International, in 2013, Erasure would finally release a proper Christmas album, titled Snow Globe.

Critical reception 
Ned Raggett from AllMusic called "Stop!" brilliant, noting the "infectious energy" of the song. Chris Gerard from Metro Weekly commented, "Opening with a whirring burst of synthesizer, "Stop!" goes right into a manic and  irresistible dance beat completely with a chorus designed for singing along. "Stop!" is 3:02 of pure energy, a sure bet to fill the dance-floor during any '80s night. "Stop!" is a synth-pop classic." Darren Lee from The Quietus noted "the pouting disco throb" of the song, stating that it is one of "the most gloriously effervescent pop anthems ever recorded."

Track listing 

 All tracks written by Clarke/Bell

7", Mute / E Mute 93 (UK)
 "Stop!" (fade ending) – 2:55
 "The Hardest Part" – 3:40
 "Knocking on Your Door" – 2:57
 "She Won't Be Home" – 3:28

 There was also a 2 track 7" produced mainly for jukeboxes (Mute 93) with the same versions of "Stop!" and "Knocking on Your Door" as the 4 track version.

7", Sire-Reprise / 22879-7 (US)
 "Stop!" (7-inch version) – 2:55
 "Ship of Fools" – 4:01

 "7-inch version" same as "fade ending"
 also released on MC (22879-4)

12", Mute / 12 Mute 93 (UK)

 "Stop!" (cold ending) – 3:03
 "The Hardest Part" (12" version) – 5:07
 "Knocking on Your Door" (12" version) – 3:59
 "She Won't Be Home" – 3:28

 also released on CD (CD Mute 93)

12", Mute / L12 Mute 93 (UK)

 "Stop!" (Mark Saunders remix) – 5:47
 "Knocking on Your Door" (Mark Saunders remix) – 6:07
 "God Rest Ye Merry, Gentlemen" – 3:12

 released as "Crackers International part II"
 also released on CD (LCD Mute 93)

12", Sire-Reprise / 25904-1 (US)

 "Stop!" (7-inch version) – 2:55
 "The Hardest Part" – 3:40
 "Stop!" (12" remix) – 5:47
 "Knocking on Your Door" – 2:57
 "She Won't Be Home" – 3:28
 "Knocking on Your Door" (12" remix) – 6:07

 also released on CD (25904-2) and MC (25904-4)
 12" mixes by Mark Saunders

CD, Mute / EBX 3.1 (UK)
 "Stop!" (cold ending) – 3:03
 "The Hardest Part" – 3:40
 "Knocking On Your Door" – 2:57
 "She Won't Be Home" – 3:28
 "The Hardest Part" (12" version) – 5:06
 "Knocking On Your Door" (12" version) – 3:59
 "Stop!" (Mark Saunders remix) – 5:47
 "Knocking on Your Door" (Mark Saunders remix) – 6:07
 "God Rest Ye Merry Gentlemen" – 3:10

 part of the CD single box set

Charts

Weekly charts

Year-end charts

Personnel 

 Erasure– producer
 Cameron Jenkins – assistant engineer
 Phil Legg – mixing
 Jock Loveband – assistant engineer
 Alan Moulder – engineer
 Mark Saunders – remixing, mixing

Remixers

Mark Saunders 
 "Stop!" (Mark Saunders remix) – 5:47
 "Knocking on Your Door" (12" version) – 3:59
 "Knocking on Your Door" (Mark Saunders remix) – 6:07

Mark Saunders and Phil Legg 
 "Stop!" (cold ending) – 3:03
 "Stop!" (fade ending) – 2:55

Phil Legg 
 "She Won't Be Home" – 3:28
 "The Hardest Part" (12" version) – 5:07

References 

1988 EPs
Erasure albums
Mute Records EPs
Christmas EPs
1988 Christmas albums
Christmas albums by English artists
Number-one singles in Denmark
UK Independent Singles Chart number-one singles